Karel Neffe (6 July 1948 – 13 February 2020) was a Czech rower who competed for Czechoslovakia in the 1972 Summer Olympics, in the 1976 Summer Olympics, and in the 1980 Summer Olympics.

He was born in Prague in 1948 and is the father of Karel Neffe Jr.

In 1972 he was a crew member of the Czechoslovak boat which won the bronze medal in the coxed fours event. Four years later he finished fourth with the Czechoslovak boat in the 1976 coxed fours competition. At the 1980 Games he was part of the Czechoslovak boat which finished fourth in the eight contest.

References

1948 births
2020 deaths
Czech male rowers
Czechoslovak male rowers
Olympic rowers of Czechoslovakia
Rowers at the 1972 Summer Olympics
Rowers at the 1976 Summer Olympics
Rowers at the 1980 Summer Olympics
Olympic bronze medalists for Czechoslovakia
Olympic medalists in rowing
Medalists at the 1972 Summer Olympics
World Rowing Championships medalists for Czechoslovakia
European Rowing Championships medalists
Rowers from Prague